Know (stylized as Know.) is the sixth studio album by American singer-songwriter Jason Mraz. The album was released on August 10, 2018 by Atlantic Records. The album's lead single "Have It All" was released on April 27, 2018, accompanied by a video filmed with performing arts students from his hometown of Richmond. The video for the third track released on July 6, 2018, "Might as Well Dance", features footage shot at Mraz's wedding.

The album is a further collaboration between Jason Mraz and the members of indie-rock-folk band Raining Jane: Mai Bloomfield, Becky Gebhardt, Chaska Potter and Mona Tavakoli, with whom Mraz has been working since 2007, and who were his backing band on his previous album Yes!. The band returns to back him on Know. and helped in writing a number of songs as well. Commercially, the album achieved success, reaching the top ten tier of the U.S. Billboard 200 chart.

Commercial performance
In the United States, Know debuted at number nine on the US Billboard 200 with 33,000 album-equivalent units, which included 26,000 pure album sales. It serves as Jason Mraz's fifth top-ten album in the country.

Track listing

Notes
  signifies an additional producer

Personnel
Jason Mraz – vocals, acoustic guitar
Andrew Wells – production, engineering, electric guitar, acoustic guitar, piano, organ, percussion
Rob Humphreys – drums, percussion
Sean Hurley – bass
Eric Ruscinski – piano, organ, acoustic guitar 
Drew Taubenfeld – pedal steel, acoustic guitar
Tony Maserati – mixing
Andre de Santanna – production, engineering, bass
Leo Costa – drums, percussion
Molly Miller – electric guitar
Daniel Mandelman – piano, organ, wurlitzer
Pedro Collini - percussion 
Carlos Sosa - saxophone 
Raul Vallejo - trombone 
Fernado Castillo - trumpet
Todd Spadafore - organ

Raining Jane
Mai Bloomfield – vocals
Becky Gebhardt – writing
Chaska Potter – vocals
Mona Tavakoli – vocals

Charts

Release history

References

2018 albums
Jason Mraz albums
Atlantic Records albums